Archbishop Volodymyr Viytyshyn (born 9 November 1959) is a Ukrainian Greek Catholic hierarch as an Archbishop-Metropolitan of Ukrainian Catholic Archeparchy of Ivano-Frankivsk since 2 June 2005 (until 21 November 2011 in rank of Eparchial Bishop). Previously he served as a Coadjutor Bishop of Kolomyia-Chernivtsi from 13 May 2003 until 12 December 2004 and as an Eparchial Bishop of the same Kolomyia-Chernivtsi from 12 December 2004 until 2 June 2005.

Life
Archbishop Viytyshyn was born in the family of clandestine Greek-Catholics in Vinnytsia Oblast, but in early childhood moved with parents to the Ternopil Oblast, where he grew up. After graduation of the school education he made a compulsory service in the Soviet Army.

In this time he was clandestinely ordained as priest by Bishop Pavlo Vasylyk on May 26, 1982, after he completed clandestine theological studies and made a pastoral work among faithful of the "Catacomb Church". Fr. Viytyshyn was among these persons, who on 4 August 1987 made a declaration about exit from clandestinity of the Ukrainian Greek Catholic Church. From 1990 until 1997 he served as Dean of Tlumach Deanery and from 1997 until 2003 as an Econom of the Eparchy of Kolomyia-Chernivtsi. At the same time he continued his theological studies in the Theological Seminary in Ivano-Frankivsk and Catholic University of Lublin in Poland.

On May 13, 2003 Fr. Viytyshyn was elected and on July 15, 2003 was consecrated to the Episcopate as the Coadjutor Bishop of the Ukrainian Catholic Eparchy of Kolomyia-Chernivtsi. The principal consecrator was Cardinal Lubomyr Husar, the Head of the Ukrainian Greek Catholic Church.

References

External links

1959 births
Living people
People from Vinnytsia Oblast
John Paul II Catholic University of Lublin alumni
Ukrainian Eastern Catholics
Recipients of the Order of Merit (Ukraine), 3rd class
Bishops of the Ukrainian Catholic Archeparchy of Ivano-Frankivsk
Archbishops of the Ukrainian Greek Catholic Church